'''Dezful University of Medical Sciences (DUMS)''' is one of the leading universities in Khuzestan province and the whole country. This university is affiliated to the Ministry of Health and Medical Education of Iran.

University History
Dezful Medical Faculty initially admitted 30 students in 1372 (1992)  who were considered as a quota for this faculty. However, this quota was canceled due to lack of educational facilities at the faculty after 3 years. Later, Dezful Medical Faculty admitted students through the university entrance examination, but the admitted students studied at Jundishapur University of Medical Sciences and Health Services of Ahvaz. The procedure continued until 1386 (2007) when the Faculty of Emergency Medicine officially and physically began its activity with the admittance of 60 undergraduate students at the Faculty of Emergency Medicine in Dezful.

In 1387(2008), the center succeeded in obtaining the principled consent for the license of the Faculty of Medical Sciences as an independent educational, research and therapeutic unit and managed to admit 90 students through the university entrance examination for all three fields of study including the bachelor of laboratory, nursing, and anesthesiology. This college was awarded a medical license in 1391(2012), and in the year 2012 along with the second round of provincial travel of the Presidency and the Supreme Board of the Ministry of Health and Medical Education, initial studies were launched to examine the upgrade of the faculty to the University of Medical Sciences, and with the establishment of 3 Faculty of Nursing and, Paramedicine and Medicine, as well as the training of the Dezful Hospital and the establishment of specialized ICUs (NICUs), Dialysis, MRI, Spiral CT Scan, Angiography, and Physical Growth And increasing educational and research facilities in 2013 Dezful Faculty of Medical Sciences were upgraded to Dezful University of Medical Sciences.

One of the major achievements of the University in 1397 (2018) was to obtain the approval of the internal assistant of the Ministry of Health and Medical Education, which is the advent of the graduate level at the university level. In 2018, the University of Dezful received a license to conduct the OSCE test for clinical competency testing and has achieved significant success in the field of basic science and pre-internship tests in the last few years.

Developmental stages of the university in accordance with health goals
1993: Faculty of Medicine
2007: Faculty of Emergency Medicine
2008: became Independent from Ahvaz University of medical sciences
2012: Admission of the first course of medical students independently
2013: Upgrade to university
2016: Entry of the first medical students to the practice stage
2017: preparing the preliminaries of establishing new fields of studies and obtaining a license for admission of postgraduate students.
2017: obtaining permission license for the internship, holding two Objective Structured Clinical Examination (OSCE) at the Faculty of Nursing and Midwifery.

Schools and faculty members
DUMS consists of three schools:
 Faculty of Medicine
 Faculty of Nursing 
 Faculty of Paramedical Sciences

From 2013 to 2018, the total number of faculty members increased from 28 members to 97 including 47 clinical faculty members, 21 basic sciences faculty members, and 28 instructors.

Fields and capabilities of the university
 Medicine
 Internal medicine
 Nursing
 Laboratory sciences
 Anesthesia
 Surgical technology 
 Medical emergency
 Public health
At present, the potential of students enrolled in the university is over 1100. Also, the number of staff working in Dezful University of Medical Sciences is about 4300.

DUMS Educational Hospitals
 Grand Dezful Hospital

Higher education centers in the region which are under the auspices of DUMS
 Dezful University of Medical Sciences
 Jundishapur University of Technology- Dezful
 Islamic Azad University, Dezful Branch
 Teacher education center of Shahid Rajaee, Dezful
 Teacher education center of Khadija Kobra, Dezful
 Payame Noor University of Dezful
 Center of applied science and technology, Dezful
 Islamic Azad University, Shush Branch
 Payame Noor University of Shush
 Islamic Azad University, Gotvand Branch
 Payame Noor University of Gotvand

References

External links
 Official Website of the Dezful University of Medical Sciences
 http://educationiran.ir/en/dezful/dums

Dezful, University of Medical Sciences
Dezful, University of Medical Sciences
Education in Khuzestan Province
Buildings and structures in Khuzestan Province
1987 establishments in Iran